Ambivalence Avenue is a studio album by English folk/electronica musician Bibio, released in 2009. It is his first album on Warp.

Critical reception 
At Metacritic, which assigns a weighted average score out of 100 to reviews from mainstream critics, Ambivalence Avenue received an average score of 78% based on 16 reviews, indicating "generally favorable reviews".

Pitchfork named it the 33rd best album of 2009.

Track listing

Charts

References

External links 
 

2009 albums
Bibio albums
Warp (record label) albums